The 2nd CARIFTA Games was held in Port of Spain, Trinidad and Tobago on May 4–5, 1973.

Participation (unofficial)

Detailed result lists can be found on the "World Junior Athletics History" website.  An unofficial count yields the number of about 137 athletes (116 junior (under-20) and 21 youth (under-17)) from about 10 countries:  Bahamas (8), Barbados (26), Bermuda (19), Grenada (9), Guyana (10), Jamaica (32), Lesser Antilles (2), Saint Vincent and the Grenadines (3), Trinidad and Tobago (27), US Virgin Islands (1).

Medal summary
Medal winners are published by category: Boys under 20 (Junior), Girls under 20 (Junior), Boys under 17 (Youth), and Girls under 17 (Youth),
Complete results can be found on the "World Junior Athletics History" website.

Boys under 20 (Junior)

Girls under 20 (Junior)

Boys under 17 (Youth)

Girls under 17 (Youth)

Medal table (unofficial)

References

External links
World Junior Athletics History

CARIFTA Games
International athletics competitions hosted by Trinidad and Tobago
1973 in Trinidad and Tobago
CARIFTA
1973 in Caribbean sport